Encinal is a city in La Salle County, Texas, United States. The population was 540 at the 2020 census.  Interstate 35 Business runs through the community. There are few businesses in Encinal; most have closed along the main street.

Railroad officials named the town for the Spanish word for oak grove. The population peaked in 1937 at eight hundred residents.

History
Encinal may be named for the Spanish word for a holm or holly oak grove. The town was supposed to be the county seat for Encinal County which was established on February 1, 1856 and was to consist of the eastern portion of Webb County, Texas. The county was never organized and was finally dissolved on March 12, 1899. The Encinal territory was absorbed into Webb County, and Encinal became part of La Salle County.

Geography

Climate
The climate in this area is characterized by hot, humid summers and generally mild to cool winters.  According to the Köppen Climate Classification system, Encinal has a humid subtropical climate, abbreviated "Cfa" on climate maps.

Transportation

Highways
  Interstate Highway 35, exit 38, Runs directly through town to the east.
  Texas State Highway 44. Runs through town, Ends at US 83 far west of town.
  US 83. Bypasses town to the Far West.

Air travel
 Laredo International Airport (in Laredo)

Demographics

2020 census

As of the 2020 United States census, there were 540 people, 380 households, and 331 families residing in the city.

2000 census
As of the census of 2000, there were 629 people, 215 households, and 159 families residing in the city. The population density was 1,616.4 people per square mile (622.7/km2). There were 276 housing units at an average density of 709.2/sq mi (273.2/km2). The racial makeup of the city was 74.56% White, 0.16% African American, 0.32% Native American, 23.05% from other races, and 1.91% from two or more races. Hispanic or Latino of any race were 91.26% of the population.

There were 215 households, out of which 40.5% had children under the age of 18 living with them, 51.2% were married couples living together, 17.7% had a female householder with no husband present, and 25.6% were non-families. 22.3% of all households were made up of individuals, and 12.1% had someone living alone who was 65 years of age or older. The average household size was 2.93 and the average family size was 3.50.

In the city, the population was spread out, with 31.8% under the age of 18, 9.9% from 18 to 24, 24.6% from 25 to 44, 19.7% from 45 to 64, and 14.0% who were 65 years of age or older. The median age was 31 years. For every 100 females, there were 101.0 males. For every 100 females age 18 and over, there were 102.4 males.

The median income for a household in the city was $14,853, and the median income for a family was $18,125. Males had a median income of $18,250 versus $13,750 for females. The per capita income for the city was $6,928. About 37.2% of families and 38.1% of the population were below the poverty line, including 42.9% of those under age 18 and 30.2% of those age 65 or over.

Education
 Encinal is within the Cotulla Independent School District.

Notable people

 Rodney Lewis, CEO of Lewis Energy, has a ranch in Encinal
 George Strait, country music artist lives on his 8,000+ acre ranch near Encinal

Gallery

References

External links
 

Cities in Texas
Cities in La Salle County, Texas